Elachista occidentella is a moth of the family Elachistidae that is endemic to Portugal.

References

occidentella
Moths described in 1992
Endemic arthropods of Portugal
Moths of Europe